Carabus sylvestris is a species of either black or brown-coloured ground beetle in the Carabinae subfamily that can be found in Austria, Czech Republic, Hungary, Italy, Liechtenstein, Poland, Romania, Slovakia, Slovenia, Ukraine, and the Netherlands.

Subspecies include:
 Carabus sylvestris haberfelneri
 Carabus sylvestris kolbi
 Carabus sylvestris redtenbacheri
 Carabus sylvestris sylvestris

References

sylvestris
Beetles described in 1793
Beetles of Europe